Valeri Fyodorovich Balyasnikov (born 16 November 1943; died 17 November 1999) was a Russian professional footballer.

Club career
He made his professional debut in the Soviet Top League in 1963 for FC Dynamo Moscow.

Honours
 Soviet Top League champion: 1963.
 Soviet Cup winner: 1970.
 European Cup Winners' Cup 1971–72 finalist (1 game).

References

1943 births
Footballers from Moscow
1999 deaths
Soviet footballers
FC Dynamo Moscow players
PFC Krylia Sovetov Samara players
Soviet Top League players
Association football goalkeepers
FC Torpedo Moscow players
FC Dynamo Bryansk players
FC Karpaty Lviv players
FC Spartak Kostroma players